Lutchmeeparsadsing Ramsahok (1948-2017) was a Mauritian trade unionist, politician and minister.

Early life
Lutchmeeparsadsing Ramsahok (also known as Ramsewak) was born in a Hindu family in Mare d'Albert, Mauritius.

Career as a Trade Unionist
Ramsahok became President of the Tea Industry Workers Union in 1971. Three years later he was elected President of the General Workers Federation (GWF) in 1974.

Political career
As a candidate of the MMM at the 1976 General Elections in Constituency No. 12 (Mahebourg Plaine Magnien) he was elected to the Legislative Assembly where he served as member of the Opposition. In June 1982 Ramsahok was again elected in Constituency No.12 as candidate of MMM-PSM coalition.

In 1983 Ramsahok was one of the founding fathers of the new party MSM which was originally a splinter group from the MMM and led by Anerood Jugnauth.

At the August 1983 elections he was voted back in Parliament as candidate of the Labour-MSM alliance, where he served as Minister of Local Government until April 1987 when he was forced to resign due to the publication of the report of the Judge Maurice Rault's Commission of Enquiry on Drug Trafficking (1986).

Ramsahok did not take part in the 1987 General Elections. He formed a new party called Parti Action Liberal and was a candidate of that party at the general elections of 1991, 1995, 2000, 2010 and 2014 but he was not elected.

References

1948 births
2017 deaths
Trade union leaders
Government ministers of Mauritius
Members of the National Assembly (Mauritius)
Mauritian Militant Movement politicians
Militant Socialist Movement politicians
Mauritian Hindus
Mauritian politicians of Indian descent